Mimolagrida is a genus of longhorn beetles of the subfamily Lamiinae, containing the following species:

 Mimolagrida rufa Breuning, 1947
 Mimolagrida rufescens Breuning, 1947
 Mimolagrida ruficollis Breuning, 1957

References

Tragocephalini
Cerambycidae genera